Decimal could mean:

The decimal or base ten numeral system
 Decimal (unit), an obsolete unit of measure in India and Bangladesh
 Decimal data type, a data type used to represent non-repeating decimal fractions
 Decimal fraction, a fraction whose denominator is a power of ten
 Decimal representation, a mathematical expression for a number written as a series
 Decimal separator, used to mark the boundary between the ones and tenths place in numbers (e.g. "12.4"), often referred to as a "decimal"
 "Decimal", a 2013 track by Orchestral Manoeuvres in the Dark from the album English Electric
 Decimal (typeface) a font designed by Hoefler & Co. inspired by the markings on watch dials.

See also
 Decimal classification
 Decimal section numbering